The B-class submarines were three United States Navy submarines built by the Fore River Shipbuilding Company in Quincy, Massachusetts, under a subcontract from the Electric Boat Company. They were eventually stationed in the Philippines, an American possession, beginning in 1912–15. They were shipped there on colliers (coal-carrying ships). All three were stricken and expended as targets 1919–22.

Design
These vessels introduced some features intended to increase underwater speed, including a small sail and a rotating cap over the torpedo tube muzzles.  The streamlined, rotating torpedo tube muzzle cap eliminated the drag that muzzle holes would otherwise cause. In the stowed position, the submarine appears to have no torpedo tubes, as the holes in the cap are covered by the bow stem.  This feature remained standard through the K class, after which it was replaced with shutters that were standard through the 1950s.

For extended surface runs, the small sail was augmented with a temporary piping-and-canvas structure (see photo). Apparently the "crash dive" concept had not yet been thought of, as this would take considerable time to deploy and dismantle. This remained standard through the N class, commissioned 1917–1918. Experience in World War I showed that this was inadequate in the North Atlantic weather, and earlier submarines serving overseas in that war (E class through L class) had their bridge structures augmented with a "chariot" shield on the front of the bridge. Starting with the N class, built with lessons learned from overseas experience, US submarines had bridges more suited to surfaced operations in rough weather.

Ships
 , laid down on 5 September 1905, launched on 30 March 1907 as Viper, and commissioned on 18 October 1907, renamed B-1 on 17 November 1911. Decommissioned on 1 December 1921, and used as a target.
 , laid down on 30 August 1905, launched on 1 September 1906 as Cuttlefish, and commissioned on 18 October 1907, renamed B-2 on 17 November 1911. Decommissioned on 12 December 1919, and used as a target.
 , laid down on 5 September 1905, launched on 30 March 1907 as Tarantula, and commissioned on 3 December 1907, renamed B-3 on 17 November 1911. Decommissioned on 25 July 1921, and used as a target.

Citations

Sources
 Friedman, Norman "US Submarines through 1945: An Illustrated Design History", Naval Institute Press, Annapolis:1995, .
 Gardiner, Robert, Conway's All the World's Fighting Ships 1906–1921 Conway Maritime Press, 1985. .
 Silverstone, Paul H., U.S. Warships of World War I (Ian Allan, 1970), .

External links

 Navsource.org early submarines page
 pigboats.com : The B-boats (images and crew lists)

Submarine classes
 
 B class
1906 ships